Gekko coi is a species of gecko, a lizard in the family Gekkonidae. The species is endemic to Sibuyan Island in the central Philippines.

Etymology
The specific name, coi, honours Leonard Co, who is a Philippine botanist and conservation biologist.

Habitat
The preferred natural habitat of G. coi is forest at altitudes near sea level.

References

Further reading
Brown RM, Siler CD, Oliveros CH, Diesmos AC, Alcala AC (2011). "A New Gekko from Sibuyan Island, Central Philippines". Herpetologica 67 (4): 460–476. (Gekko coi, new species).
Gaulke M (2017). "Sibuyan – das Galapagos Asien ". Reptilia, Münster 22 (126): 68–78. (in German).

Gekko
Endemic fauna of the Philippines
Reptiles of the Philippines
Reptiles described in 2011